The Siège d'Antioche (or Estoire d'Antioche) is a Norman French rhyming poem about the First Crusade, produced either in England or Normandy in the late 12th century. It is about 19,000 lines in length and covers the period from the Council of Clermont in November 1095 to the battle of Ascalon in August 1099. It carries a spurious attribution to Archbishop Baldric of Dol and is known in full from two manuscripts and in part from two fragments. The older manuscript is Oxford, Bodleian Library, MS Hatton 77 from the 13th century. The younger is known as the Spalding manuscript and is London, British Library, MS Add. 34114 from the 14th century. There is no complete published edition of the text. Jennifer Gabel de Aguirre has published a partial edition. A complete edition is a work in progress of a variable team at Fordham University.

The Siège has usually be regarded as a freestanding, non-historiographical chanson de geste apart from the Crusade cycle.

Notes

Bibliography

External links
One digitized image from Bodleian Library MS. Hatton 77
Fully digitized Add MS 34114

Crusade poetry
Chansons de geste
12th-century poems
Epic poems in French
Anglo-Norman literature